Philadelphia College of Osteopathic Medicine (PCOM) is a private medical school with its main campus in Philadelphia, Pennsylvania, and additional locations in Suwanee, Georgia (PCOM Georgia) and Moultrie, Georgia (PCOM South Georgia).

Founded in 1899, PCOM is one of the nation's oldest medical schools. PCOM also operates several healthcare centers in Philadelphia and an osteopathic care clinic in Suwanee, Georgia. Additionally, PCOM sponsors residency training programs, which train newly graduated physicians. The Center for Chronic Disorders of Aging, which aims to improve quality of life for elderly individuals, is located on the Philadelphia campus.

History

PCOM was established on January 24, 1899, as the Philadelphia College and Infirmary of Osteopathy (PCIO).  It was the third osteopathic medical school to open in the United States.  In September 1899, the first PCIO degree was awarded, and in February 1900, the first PCIO "class," comprising one woman and one MD, graduated.  In May 1921, PCIO was renamed to Philadelphia College of Osteopathy (PCO).  In 1967, the school adopted its present-day name, becoming the Philadelphia College of Osteopathic Medicine (PCOM).

In 1973, PCOM opened a new building, Evans Hall, and relocated to its current campus along City Avenue in Philadelphia.  In 1979, PCOM acquired the adjacent office building, which was later named Rowland Hall in honor of PCOM's 4th President.  From 1995 to 1999, Evans Hall expanded to include a modern osteopathic manipulative medicine (OMM) lab, more classrooms, a new cafeteria, and the office of admissions.

During the 1990s, a series of new graduate level programs were added, expanding the scope of the medical school to a wide range of health-care related programs.  In 1993, PCOM started the graduate program in biomedical science, offering graduate certificates, and Master of Science degrees.  In 1995, a Doctor of Psychology program was established.  In 2005, the school opened a branch campus in Georgia, which graduated its first DO class in 2009.

In 2005, PCOM Georgia (formerly known as GA-PCOM) enrolled its first class of osteopathic medical students. PCOM Georgia offers the Doctor of Osteopathic Medicine degree (DO), the Doctor of Pharmacy degree, the Doctor of Physical Therapy degree and graduate programs in biomedical sciences and physician assistant studies.

In 2019, PCOM South Georgia welcomed its inaugural class of osteopathic medicine students, and in 2020, its first cohort of Master of Science in Biomedical Sciences students.

For more than a century, PCOM has trained physicians, health practitioners, and behavioral scientists.  In the United States, there are two types of physicians: DO physicians and MD physicians. Both are fully qualified physicians, licensed to prescribe medication and perform surgery.

Academics

As a free-standing medical school, PCOM offers only graduate-level training. PCOM offers doctoral degrees in osteopathic medicine (D.O.), pharmacy (PharmD), physical therapy (DPT), and psychology (PsyD). In addition, master's degrees are offered in school psychology, public health, organizational development and leadership, forensic medicine, biomedical sciences, and physician assistant studies.

PCOM is institutionally accredited by the Middle States Association of Colleges and Schools. The Doctor of Osteopathic Medicine (DO) program is accredited by the American Osteopathic Association. The Doctor of Pharmacy (PharmD) program at PCOM Georgia is accredited by the Accreditation Council for Pharmacy Education (ACPE). The Accreditation Review Commission on Education for the Physician Assistant (ARC-PA) has granted Accreditation-Continued status to the Philadelphia College of Osteopathic Medicine Physician Assistant Program sponsored by Philadelphia College of Osteopathic Medicine. Effective May 2, 2018, the Doctor of Physical Therapy Program at PCOM Georgia has been granted Candidate for Accreditation status by the Commission on Accreditation in Physical Therapy Education. PCOM's PsyD program in Clinical Psychology is accredited by the American Psychological Association and its School Psychology PsyD program is accredited on contingency by the Commission on Accreditation of the American Psychological Association.

Campuses
PCOM operates three campuses; one campus is located in Philadelphia, another is near Atlanta in Suwanee, Georgia and the third is in Moultrie, Georgia. The Philadelphia campus is 17 acres, and the Georgia campus in Suwanee is 23 acres.

The PCOM Library is the college's library. In addition to its other activities, the library is also responsible for the creation of the college's institutional repository, the Digital Commons at PCOM.

Student life
Students at both the Philadelphia and Georgia campuses have access to fitness centers, and participate in several recreational and professional clubs on campus. PCOM hosts the sole remaining chapter Phi Sigma Gamma, an osteopathic fraternity, which was founded in 1917. The college hosts an active chapter of Sigma Sigma Phi, a national Osteopathic Medicine Honors Fraternity that emphasizes community service and scholastic achievement.

Healthcare centers
In addition to its affiliation with several teaching hospitals, PCOM runs several primary care healthcare centers including Cambria Division Healthcare Center, Lancaster Avenue Healthcare Center, and Family Medicine at PCOM. The clinics serve the dual purpose of providing community-based health care as well as providing educational experiences for medical students. Services include family medicine, gynecology, dermatology, geriatrics, psychology, and OMM.

Residency programs 
PCOM residency programs include a multi-hospital integrated approach. The total position numbers can vary with program directors' plans and implementation time frame.
 Family Medicine
 General Surgery
 Internal Medicine
 Neurosurgery
 Osteopathic Neuromusculoskeletal Medicine
 Ophthalmology
 Orthopedic Surgery
 Otorhinolaryngology

Fellowship programs
 Hospice and Palliative Medicine
 Plastic and Reconstructive Surgery
 Geriatric Medicine

Center for Chronic Disorders of Aging
The mission of the Center for Chronic Disorders of Aging (CCDA) at Philadelphia College of Osteopathic Medicine is to improve the quality of life for all individuals suffering from age-related chronic diseases and disorders. The CCDA promotes a better understanding of the nature of chronic disease processes by supporting basic and applied investigations, and providing educational opportunities for the community, scientists and health care professionals. The CCDA furthers its mission through an interdisciplinary approach combining scientific research, education, and clinical application into chronic diseases and disorders associated with the aging process.

Notable alumni
Philadelphia College of Osteopathic Medicine has trained 12,941 physicians, with 2,467 non-physician alumni.

 Ethel D. Allen, American Republican politician.
 Bo Bartlett, American realist painter.
Ronald R. Blanck, first and only osteopathic physician ever appointed Surgeon General of the US Army.
 Sean Conley, incumbent Physician to the President and Commander in the US Navy.
 Ira W. Drew, Democratic politician in the U.S. House of Representatives.
 Steven Eisenberg, known as "The Singing Cancer Doctor."
 Ted Eisenberg, the Guinness World Record holder for most breast augmentation surgeries performed.
 Joseph C. Gambone, author of Essentials of Obstetrics and Gynecology. Gambone Peak on Antarctica was named in his honor in 1970.
 Joe Heck, U.S. representative for Nevada's 3rd congressional district from January 3, 2011 – January 3, 2017, and member of the Republican Party.
 Umar Johnson , social media personality who focuses on Pan-Africanism.
 Harold Osborn, U.S. Olympic Gold Medalist in track.
 Walter Prozialeck, professor at Midwestern University.
 W. Kenneth Riland, physician for President Richard M. Nixon and New York Governor Nelson A. Rockefeller, and cofounder of the New York Institute of Technology College of Osteopathic Medicine.
 Charles Sophy, psychiatrist, medical director for the LA Dept of Children and Family Services, and author of several books.
 Jennifer Strong, American soccer player who played as a defender for the United States women's national team.

See also
Medical schools in Pennsylvania

References

External links
 

Medical schools in Pennsylvania
Osteopathic medical schools in the United States
Private universities and colleges in Pennsylvania
Universities and colleges in Philadelphia
Private universities and colleges in Georgia (U.S. state)
Educational institutions established in 1899
Eastern Pennsylvania Rugby Union
Education in Gwinnett County, Georgia
Buildings and structures in Gwinnett County, Georgia
1899 establishments in Pennsylvania
West Philadelphia
Medical schools in Georgia (U.S. state)